The Santa Monica Parish Church of Alburquerque,  commonly known as the Alburquerque Church, is a Roman Catholic church in the municipality of Alburquerque, Bohol, Philippines. It is under the jurisdiction of the Roman Catholic Diocese of Tagbilaran. The church was declared as an Important Cultural Property by the National Museum of the Philippines in 2013.

The church was partially damaged when a 7.2-magnitude earthquake struck Bohol and other parts of Central Visayas last October 15, 2013. It was declared a National Historical Landmark by the National Historical Institute in 2014.

Church history

Visita of Baclayon
The parish traces its beginnings as a visita of Baclayon Church. The  settlement in the area was then known as Sagunto, after a town in Valencia, Spain. Upon the request of Doña Mariana Irag, a chapel, convento and school were erected  in 1842 at the boundary between the towns of Baclayon and Loay. The first structure in 1842 was made of wood and bamboo and was erected at the western end of the plaza, approximately where the present school stands. A larger and sturdier church was constructed on the eastern side of the plaza in 1856. The settlement was officially elevated to a town in 1861 and adopted a new name of Alburquerque, after a town in Badajoz, Spain.

Inauguration as parish
The parish was formally inaugurated in 1869, eight years after the settlement became a town. The parish was under the jurisdiction of the Augustinian Recollects until 1898, after which the secular  clergy took over.

Until the 1880s, the parish church appeared like a huge shed with three aisles and wells made of tabique. The construction of the convent was begun under Fr.  Tomas Fernandez (1869-1875). The present church structure was built under Fr. Manuel Muro in 1885, utilizing the same three-aisled plan. Construction was commenced in 1896 by his successor. The upper portions of the walls and the tower over the facade were completed only in the 1920s-1930s.

Historical and cultural declarations 
In 2013, the National Museum of the Philippines declared the church an Important Cultural Property. A historical marker was unveiled by the National Historical Commission of the Philippines on August 27, 2014.

Features 
The Alburquerque Church is in the shape of a cruciform. Remains of a low stone wall mark the boundaries of the church complex. A low hill and a ravine is located behind the whole complex. This may have a defensive purpose.

Facade
The church has a portico on the front which is actually the choirloft on the second floor. This choirloft/portico feature is typical of many Bohol churches. A series of arches in the frontage bestows a unique grace and rhythm to the ensemble.

Altar
The original retablo is gone, although there are two smaller neo-gothic style ones at both ends of the transept. These smaller side retablos are painted to simulate three-dimensional carvings. The old pulpit is still being used. On both sides of the main altar are sacristies or storage-areas.

Ceiling
Ray Francia painted the ceiling of the church from April 12 to August 3, 1932. His signature is on one side of the choirloft.

Other  Interior Details
Pillars made of large tree trunks masked by metal sheets march down the aisle of the church. It is being argued that these pillars date back to the original 1880 structure.

Choirloft
The choirloft can be reached  from the second floor of the convent by crossing the arcade. A stairway from the choirloft leads down to the nave of the church. Another staircase in the center leads up to the bell tower.

Bell Tower
The bell tower is quadrangular and was constructed in the early decades of the 20th century. Three patron saints of the parishare inscribed among the bells: Santa Monica, San Agustin and "Calipay" (Joy).

Exterior
An arcade links the church to the convento. A wide field in front of the church enables the structure to dominate over its surroundings. The grotto at the back of the courtyard hides a ruin, presumably another unfinished arcade. To the left of the church are the original twin buildings for the "escuela de ninos" built in the 1880s.

Convento
The parish rectory has a coralstone ground floor and an upper floor made of wooden boards, tabique and bricks. Over the main entrance appears the year of the inauguration which is 1876. The convento has a grand twin stairway, made under Fr. Manuel Muro (1882-1896). There is a proto-museum in one corner of the upper floor, containing some of the church's antiquities. The back of the convento has a veranda offering a view of the church. The eastern end of the convento has a massive open-air terrace or azotea built by Fray Manuel simultaneously with the stairway.

2013 Bohol earthquake
The Alburquerque church sustained minimal damage from the 2013 Bohol earthquake. Three years prior to the quake, restoration work was already being done in the parish. It is notably one of the few intact churches after the earthquake in the tourist trail of Bohol.

Historical marker
On August 27, 2014, the National Historical Commission of the Philippines installed and unveiled a historical marker at the facade of the church. The marker reads as follows:

References

Bibliography

External links

Roman Catholic churches in Bohol
Important Cultural Properties of the Philippines
Marked Historical Structures of the Philippines
Spanish Colonial architecture in the Philippines
Churches in the Roman Catholic Diocese of Tagbilaran